Hossain Mokbul Shahriar is a Jatiya Party (Ershad) politician and a Jatiya Sangsad member from the Rangpur-1 constituency. He is the nephew of Hussain Mohammad Ershad, a former President of Bangladesh.

Early life and family
Shahriar was born on 18 July 1974 to a Bengali Muslim family in Rangpur, Bangladesh. His father, Mozammel Hossain Lalu, has roots in Dinhata in present-day India. His paternal grandfather, Maqbul Hossain, was a lawyer and served as a minister of the erstwhile Maharaja of Cooch Behar.

Career
Shahriar was elected to parliament from Rangpur-1 as a Jatiya Party candidate in 2008. In January 2012, he and his men vandalized Rangpur Medical College Hospital and threatened the hospital director. He wanted the hospital to recruit his men for vacancies at the hospital. A case was filed against Shahriar with Rangpur Police Station over the clash.

In 2017, Shahriar was expelled from Jatiya Party by Ershad for contesting Rangpur City mayoral election as an independent candidate against the official candidate of Jatiya Party. He ran as an independent candidate in the Rangpur-3 by-election and lost to his cousin Saad Ershad.

References

Living people
Jatiya Party politicians
9th Jatiya Sangsad members
Place of birth missing (living people)
Bangladeshi people of Indian descent
People from Cooch Behar district
20th-century Bengalis
21st-century Bengalis
1974 births